A webbed belt, military belt, or skater belt is a type of belt, normally made of webbing, distinguished by its belt buckle design and lack of holes in the cord, which is usually found in other belts where a pin is used as the fastening mechanism in the belt buckle. A belt of this type is often used in the uniforms of armed forces as well as that of the Boy Scouts of America, since it is adjustable, cheap to produce and does not deteriorate easily.

Design 
The design of the belt buckle is usually a hollow metal rectangular box through which the cloth cord passes through, when fastened, a pin with the length equal to the width of the cord is pushed up from a groove and stops the cloth by increasing the amount of friction needed to pull the cloth cord further through the box. This mechanism removes the need for holes in the cord, which is a common feature on many other designs, it also allows the wearer to adjust the belt to the exact size needed, as it is not limited by the holes.

References 

Belts (clothing)
Military uniforms